Patrick William Roger Van Den Hauwe (born 16 December 1960) is a former professional footballer who made 401 appearances in the Football League playing for Birmingham City, Everton, Tottenham Hotspur and Millwall. Born in Belgium and raised in England, he chose to play international football for Wales, making 13 appearances.

Club career
Born in Belgium with an English mother, Van Den Hauwe was brought up in London, and joined Birmingham City as an apprentice in July 1977. He made his debut in the First Division as a 17-year-old, on 7 October 1978 in a 2–1 home defeat to Manchester City. He played 143 games for Birmingham in all competitions before joining Everton in September 1984 for a fee of £100,000. He helped them win the league title and European Cup Winners' Cup that season, as well as a second league title two years later – when his goal against Norwich City at Carrow Road confirmed them as champions.

In 1989, he signed for Tottenham Hotspur for a fee of £575,000, making his debut in a 2–0 defeat to Aston Villa on 9 September 1989. He won the FA Cup with Tottenham in 1991. In total he made 110 League appearances (six of them as substitute) between 1989 and 1993, but never scored. He finished his Football League career with Millwall.

He was commonly referred to as "Psycho Pat" by supporters, and used the nickname as the title of his autobiography.

International career
As a player with British citizenship born outside the UK, eligibility rules of the time meant that Van Den Hauwe qualified to play for the national football team of any of the four Home Nations—England, Scotland, Wales or Northern Ireland. Van Den Hauwe spurned offers from England under Bobby Robson and Belgium under Guy Thys to represent Wales, having been recommended to Mike England by Everton team-mates Kevin Ratcliffe and Neville Southall. It was often speculated in the press that Van Den Hauwe had made this decision because he had Welsh ancestry, but according to his autobiography this was not the case. "No parent or grandparent—or even great grandparents—of mine were Welsh", he wrote.

Van Den Hauwe made his international début for Wales in a 1986 FIFA World Cup qualification – UEFA Group 7 game versus Spain which ended with a 3–0 victory at the Racecourse Ground on 30 April 1985. His last game for Wales came on 26 April 1989 in a friendly 2–0 loss against Sweden, also at the Racecourse Ground.

Personal life
On 19 June 1993 he married model Mandy Smith, the former wife of Rolling Stones' bassist Bill Wyman, but they separated two years later and divorced in 1997.

Playing statistics

Honours
Birmingham City
Promotion to First Division: 1979–80

Everton
Football League champions: 1984–85, 1986–87
FA Cup: Runner-up 1984–85, 1985–86, 1988–89
UEFA Cup Winners' Cup: 1984–85
FA Charity Shield: 1985

Tottenham Hotspur
FA Cup: 1990–91
FA Charity Shield: 1991 (shared)

See also
List of Wales international footballers born outside Wales

References

External links

 - Biography: Psycho Pat: Legend or Madman

1960 births
Living people
People from Dendermonde
Welsh footballers
Wales international footballers
Belgian footballers
Welsh people of Belgian descent
English people of Belgian descent
Belgian people of English descent
Footballers from Greater London
Belgian emigrants to the United Kingdom
Association football defenders
Birmingham City F.C. players
Everton F.C. players
Tottenham Hotspur F.C. players
Millwall F.C. players
Premier League players
English Football League players
Welsh expatriate footballers
Belgian expatriate footballers
Welsh expatriate sportspeople in South Africa
Expatriate soccer players in South Africa
Hellenic F.C. players
FA Cup Final players
Footballers from East Flanders